WFBM (90.5 FM) is an American non-commercial educational radio station licensed to serve the community of Beaver Springs, Pennsylvania. The station's broadcast license is held by Beaver Springs Faith Baptist Church, Inc.

WFBM broadcasts a Southern Gospel music format. WFBM is part of a simulcast with WFBA and WFBV.

History
In October 2007, Beaver Springs Faith Baptist Church applied to the U.S. Federal Communications Commission (FCC) for a construction permit for a new broadcast radio station. The FCC granted this permit on January 15, 2010, with a scheduled expiration date of January 15, 2013. The new station was assigned call sign "WFBM" on January 26, 2010. After construction and testing were completed in January 2012, the station was granted its broadcast license on January 23, 2012.

The full-powered station replaced the church's low-power FM station, WFBM-LP, which broadcast from 2004 to January 2012.

References

External links
WFBM official website

Southern Gospel radio stations in the United States
Radio stations established in 2012
Snyder County, Pennsylvania
FBM